Gate School may refer to:

Gate School (Gate, Oklahoma), listed on the National Register of Historic Places in Beaver County, Oklahoma
Gate School (Gate, Washington), listed on the National Register of Historic Places in Thurston County, Washington